The Solitude of Prime Numbers is a 2010 Italian drama film based on the novel of the same name by Paolo Giordano. Directed by Saverio Costanzo, the film was nominated for the Golden Lion at the 67th Venice International Film Festival. The soundtrack was composed by Mike Patton and released in 2011. The title is explained by arguing that Mattia and Alice are like twin primes: both lonely, close to each other but separated by an even number.

Plot
The film is set in Italy in 1984, 1991, 2001, and 2009 and jumps back and forth in time.

Mattia and Alice (children in 1984, teenagers in 1991) are both traumatized, and isolate themselves from the people around them.

When he was a child, Mattia's mentally disabled twin sister Michela goes missing whilst he was supposed to look after her. He is intelligent and becomes a successful scientist, but he sometimes cuts himself on purpose.

When Alice was a child she had a skiing accident; which results in her having a permanent limp and a significant scar on her thigh. As a teenager she is bullied by female classmates.

They meet while teenagers and become friends, but lose contact when Mattia goes to work in Germany. Eight years later Alice writes him a very brief request to come back to Italy, which he does, and they reunite.

Cast
 Alba Rohrwacher as Alice (adult)
 Luca Marinelli as Mattia Balossino (adult)
 Arianna Nastro as Alice (Teen)
 Vittorio Lomartire as Mattia (Teen)
 Martina Albano as Alice (children)
 Tommaso Neri as Mattia (children)
 Aurora Ruffino as Viola
 Giorgia Pizzo as Michela
 Isabella Rossellini as Adele
 Maurizio Donadoni as Umberto
 Roberto Sbaratto as Pietro
 Giorgia Senesi as Elena
 Andrea Jublin as Fabio
 Filippo Timi as Clown

References

External links
 

2010 films
2010 drama films
Italian drama films
2010s Italian-language films
Films directed by Saverio Costanzo
Films set in Turin
2010s Italian films